Hibbertia turleyana is a species of flowering plant in the family Dilleniaceae and is endemic to a small area in the south of Western Australia. It is a low-lying shrub with more or less glabrous, linear leaves and bright yellow flowers with eight or nine stamens in a single group on one side of two densely hairy carpels.

Description
There are eight, sometimes nine stamens fused at the base on one side of the two densely hairy carpels that each contain two ovules.

Taxonomy
Hibbertia turleyana was first formally described in 2004 Judith R. Wheeler in the journal Nuytsia from specimens she collected in Helms Arboretum 2000. The specific epithet (turleyana) honours Coral Turley of Esperance, "in appreciation of her assistance".

Distribution and habitat
This hibbertia grows in heath and mallee shrubland and is apparently restricted to a small area just north of Esperance in the Esperance Plains and Mallee biogeographic regions of Western Australia.

Conservation status
Hibbertia turleyana is listed as "Priority Two" by the Western Australian Government Department of Biodiversity, Conservation and Attractions, meaning that it is poorly known and from only one or a few locations.

See also
List of Hibbertia species

References

turleyana
Flora of Western Australia
Plants described in 2004